Waqar Hussain Shah is a Pakistani politician who had been a Member of the Provincial Assembly of Sindh, from June 2013 to May 2018.

Early life and education
He was born on 10 June 1967 in Karachi.

He has a degree of Master of Arts in political science.

Political career

He was elected to the Provincial Assembly of Sindh as a candidate of Mutahida Quami Movement from Constituency PS-128 KARACHI-XL in by-polls held in June 2013.

References

Living people
Sindh MPAs 2013–2018
1967 births
Muttahida Qaumi Movement politicians